Hung Pham or Hung Kim Pham (born Phạm Kim Hưng; October 2, 1963 in Saigon) is a former politician and information expert in Alberta, Canada. He formerly served as a member of Legislative Assembly of Alberta, Canada.

Early life
Born and growing up in Saigon, the capital of South Vietnam, Hung Pham was one of the boat people leaving the country after Vietnam War. Coming to Canada in 1980 at the age of 16 without English, teenager Hung Pham worked as a part-time janitor to make his living while going to high-school in Calgary.

Education
Hung Pham completed his high-school education in 1982 and subsequently took the computer science university transfer program at Mount Royal College, where he received many awards and scholarships for outstanding academic achievements. Pham then transferred to University of Calgary in 1984 and graduated from the university in 1986 with two bachelor's degrees with Distinction: Bachelor of Science with Distinction in Computer Science and Bachelor of Science with Distinction in Pure Mathematics. He went on to take Master program at University of Calgary, specializing in Artificial Intelligence.

Career
Starting as a prominent Information Analyst with Canalta Data Services in 1988, Hung Pham joined The City of Calgary in 1989 as a Database Technical Analyst. He was promoted by The City of Calgary to be Senior Programmer Analyst in 1991.

Community activities
As an active member of many non-profit organizations, Hung Pham helped Calgary Police Service with its multicultural and crime prevention programs. He was elected President of Calgary Vietnamese Canadian Association in 1990. In this position, he promoted programs to help low income workers. With his well-known speech delivered to the community on 1991 Tết celebration event, Pham publicly declared his programs to help cleaners in Calgary.

Political career
Elected to Legislative Assembly of Alberta (Progressive Conservative), Canada at the age of 29, Hung Pham was the youngest Member of Legislative Assembly (MLA) in Alberta Legislature at the time. He is also the very first Vietnamese ever elected to a legislature outside of Vietnam.

Re-elected four times later, Hung Pham has held many high-rank positions in Alberta Government. In 2006, he was promoted by Premier Ed Stelmach to be a member of Alberta Treasury Board, the legislative body responsible for all expenditures and budgets of Alberta (Premier Ed Stelmach is also a member of the board).

In January, 2008, Hung Pham announced that he would not seek re-election.

References

External links
 http://www.assembly.ab.ca/net/index.aspx?p=mla_bio&rnumber=17 Legislative Assembly of Alberta Elected Members Biography

1963 births
Progressive Conservative Association of Alberta MLAs
Canadian activists
Canadian engineers
Living people
People from Ho Chi Minh City
Vietnamese community activists
Vietnamese engineers
Vietnamese emigrants to Canada
Canadian politicians of Vietnamese descent
Vietnamese refugees
People in information technology
Politicians from Calgary
21st-century Canadian politicians